Dušan Radolský (born 13 November 1950) is a Slovak former football player and manager.

He has previously managed Polish top flight teams Groclin and Ruch Chorzów. In 2005, under Radolsky, Groclin won the Polish Cup for the first time in their history (in 2020, in connection with proven cases of corruption, they were deprived of this title) and he was made an honorary citizen of the town of Grodzisk Wielkopolski.

During 1998 he spent a short time as interim coach of the Slovakia national football team. In October 1999 the Slovak Under-21 football squad, under Radolsky, defeated Azerbaijan U21s 3–0 to win its qualifying group for the European championships. The team was eventually among the top four that qualified for the Sydney 2000 Olympics.

Honours

Manager
Slovakia U-21
2000 UEFA European Under-21 Championship: 4th place

MŠK Žilina
2008–09 UEFA Cup: Group stage

References

External links 
 

1959 births
Living people
Sportspeople from Trnava
Czechoslovak footballers
Slovak footballers
FC Spartak Trnava players
Association football forwards
Czechoslovak football managers
Slovak football managers
Slovak expatriate football managers
FK Hvězda Cheb managers
Slovakia national football team managers
Slovakia national under-21 football team managers
FC Spartak Trnava managers
SK Sigma Olomouc managers
FC Hradec Králové managers
FC VSS Košice managers
1. FC Slovácko managers
ŠK Slovan Bratislava managers
Ruch Chorzów managers
MŠK Žilina managers
FC DAC 1904 Dunajská Streda managers
Polonia Warsaw managers
Bruk-Bet Termalica Nieciecza managers
Al Shabab Al Arabi Club Dubai non-playing staff
Expatriate football managers in Poland
Slovak expatriate sportspeople in Poland
Expatriate football managers in the United Arab Emirates
Slovak expatriate sportspeople in the United Arab Emirates
Expatriate football managers in the Czech Republic
Slovak expatriate sportspeople in the Czech Republic
FK Dukla Banská Bystrica managers
Partizán Bardejov managers
Dyskobolia Grodzisk Wielkopolski managers